Leach is an unincorporated community in Carroll County, in the U.S. state of Tennessee.

History
A post office called Leach was established in 1880, and remained in operation until 1986. The community was named for the local Leach family.

References

Unincorporated communities in Carroll County, Tennessee
Unincorporated communities in Tennessee